Scapece alla vastese is a traditional dish from Abruzzo; in its preparation mackerel and oily fish are used; then, once fried, the fish is immersed in vinegar and saffron which gives it the intense yellow color that characterizes it.

See also
 Cuisine of Abruzzo
 List of fish dishes

References

External links
Fish Chutney | Regione Abruzzo - Dipartimento Turismo, Cultura e Paesaggio

Italian seafood dishes
Cuisine of Abruzzo